Kris Alan Hemensley (born 26 April 1946) is an English-Australian poet who has published around 20 collections of poetry. Through the late 1960s and '70s he was involved in poetry workshops at La Mama, and edited the literary magazines Our Glass, The Ear in a Wheatfield, and others. The Ear played an important role in providing a place where poets writing outside what was then the mainstream (such as Jennifer Maiden) could publish their work.  In 1969 and 1970 he presented the program Kris Hemensley's Melbourne on ABC Radio.  In the 1970s he was poetry editor for Meanjin

The son of an Egyptian mother and an English father who was stationed in Egypt with the Royal Air Force, Hemensley was born on the Isle of Wight, and spent his early childhood in Alexandria.  He visited Australia at the age of 18, and emigrated there in 1966. He was awarded the Christopher Brennan Award in 2005, which recognizes poetry of "sustained quality and distinction".

Hemensley managed Collected Works, a specialist poetry bookshop in Melbourne, Australia, until it closed down in late 2018.

Poetry collections
 Two Poets ([s.l.: s.n., [1968]). - with Ken Taylor
 The Going and Other Poems (Heidelberg West, Vic: Michael Dugan, 1969).
 Dreams (London: Edible Magazine, 1971).
 The Soft Poems: For Timothy (Bexleyheath, UK: Prison Clothes/Joe DiMaggio Press, 1972).
 Rocky Mountains and Tired Indians (Bexleyheath, UK: Joe DiMaggio Press, 1973).
 Love's Voyages (St Lucia, Qld: Makar Press, 1974).
 Domestications: A Selection of Poems 1968–1972 (Melbourne: Sun Books, 1974).
 Sulking in the Seventies (Clifton Hill, Vic: Ragman Productions, 1975).
 The Poem of the Clear Eye (Carlton, Vic: Paper Castle, 1975).
 Beginning Again: Poems 1976 (Sydney: Sea Cruise Books, 1978).
 The Moths (Carlton, Vic: Paper Castle, 1978).
 The Miro Poems (Alverstoke, UK: Stingy Artist, 1979).
 A Mile From Poetry (Sydney: Island Press, 1979).
 Trace (Port Melbourne, Vic: Ingles St Press, 1984).
 Sit(e) ([Weymouth], UK: Stingy Artist/Last Straw, 1987).
 Your Scratch Entourage (Victoria, Australia: Cordite Publishing Inc., 2016).

Further reading
 Martin Duwell, ‘Kris Hemensley,’ in A Possible Contemporary Poetry: Interviews with Thirteen Poets from the New Australian Poetry (St Lucia, Qld: Makar Press, 1982), pp. 50–66.
 Carl Harrison-Ford, ‘Poetics before Politics: A Note on Kris Hemensley’s "New Australian Poetry",’ Meanjin Quarterly 29.2 (1970), pp. 226–31.
 Kris Hemensley, ‘First Look at "The New Australian Poetry",’ Meanjin Quarterly 29.1 (1970), pp. 118–21.
 Kris Hemensley, Introduction, The Best of the Ear: The Ear in a Wheatfield, 1973–1976: A Portrait of a Magazine (Clifton Hill, Vic: Rigmorale Books, 1985).
 Kris Hemensley, ‘ "…The Wild Assertion of Vitality" ’ Australian Literary Studies 8.2 (1977), pp. 226–39.
 Marcus O’Donnell, ‘Kris Hemensley: Reflections on Three Generations,’ The Small Press Times (1992), p. 1.
 Ken Taylor, ‘Kris Hemensley’s Melbourne,’ Melbourne On My Mind (Melbourne: ABC, 1976), pp. 49–63.
 Jim Tulip, ‘Towards an Australian Modernism: New Writings of Kris Hemensley,’ Southerly 37.2 (1977), pp. 142–51.

Notes

External links
 Newspaper article on Hemensley and the Christopher Brennan Award
 Newspaper article on Hemensley's bookshop
 Australian Literary Resources bio page
 Hemensley's note on the La Mama poetry workshops
 Aust Lit entry
 
 Australian Poetry Library - Kris Hemensley)

Living people
1946 births
Australian poets
English emigrants to Australia
Writers from Melbourne
People from the Isle of Wight
People from Alexandria